The Roman Catholic Diocese of Wilcannia–Forbes is  a suffragan Latin Rite diocese of the Archdiocese of Sydney, established in 1887, initially as the Diocese of Wilcannia (this town on the Darling River was then important due to the dominance of river transport), and then changed to the current name in 1917. At this time, six parochial districts of Bathurst Diocese, including those of Parkes and Forbes, were added to its western neighbour. The diocese covers the Far West region of New South Wales in Australia. The Bishop's office is in Forbes but his seat is in Sacred Heart Cathedral, Broken Hill.

History 
In 1887, the Diocese of Wilcannia was erected by Pope Leo XIII, on territories taken from the three now-neighbouring dioceses: Armidale, Bathurst (see below) and Goulburn (later absorbed in the present Canberra-Goulburn Archdiocese), making it one of the oldest dioceses in Australia.
 
In 1917, the area of the diocese was enlarged (at the expense of the neighbouring diocese of Bathurst) and its name changed to the Diocese of Wilcannia–Forbes to take account of the added parishes.

On 9 June 2009, Pope Benedict XVI accepted the resignation of Bishop Christopher Toohey due to reasons of personal health. In April 2011, Bishop Toohey released a personal statement admitting that his behaviour during the early years of his ministry with young adults in his pastoral care was "not consistent with that required of a good person". Although the specific behaviours were not mentioned, the church stated that any acts were not criminal in nature. To date, Bishop Toohey is the most senior member of the Church to admit to inappropriate behaviour with young adults. The Pope appointed Sydney auxiliary bishop Terence Brady as apostolic administrator from 2009 until 2011. In 2011 the Bishop Emeritus of Parramatta, Kevin Michael Manning, was appointed to succeed Brady.

Bishops

Ordinaries
The following individual was elected as Bishop of Wilcannia:

The following individuals have been elected as Bishop of Wilcannia–Forbes:

In absence of an appointed Bishop, the following bishops have been appointed as Apostolic Administrator of Wilcannia–Forbes:
Terence John Gerard Brady – Apostolic Administrator (9 June 2009 – 30 Dec 2011)
Kevin Michael Manning – Apostolic Administrator (30 December 2011 – 1 December 2012)
Michael Robert Kennedy – Apostolic Administrator (01 Dec 2012 – 6 July 2014)

Auxiliary bishop
Douglas Joseph Warren (1964–1967), appointed Bishop here

Other priests of this diocese who became bishops
Andrew Killian, appointed Bishop of Port Augusta in 1924
William Joseph Brennan, appointed Bishop of Toowoomba in 1953
William John Brennan, appointed Bishop of Wagga Wagga in 1984

Cathedral
Sacred Heart Cathedral, Broken Hill has been the cathedral of the diocese since 1905, though the bishops of Wilcannia had their residence in Broken Hill since 1889.  The cathedral parish has some 5,500 parishioners, most of whom live in Broken Hill.

Parishes
Churches are located in the following parishes and locations (dedicated to saints as indicated):

Boundaries
With  in its territory, the Diocese of Wilcannia–Forbes is the largest diocese in New South Wales. More than half of the State is part of its territory. The boundaries were enlarged in 1917 to include six new parochial areas taken from Bathurst Diocese, including the parishes of Forbes and Parkes.

Schools

Balranald (St Joseph's Primary School)
Bourke	(St Ignatius Primary School)
Brewarrina (St Patrick's Primary School)
Broken Hill (Sacred Heart Parish Primary School)
Cobar (St John's Primary School)

Condobolin (St Joseph's Primary School)
Deniliquin (St Michael's Parish School)
Forbes	(St Laurence's Primary School and Red Bend Catholic College
Hay (St Mary's Primary School)

Hillston (St Joseph's Primary School)
Narromine (St Augustine's Primary School)
Nyngan (St Joseph's Primary School)
Parkes (Holy Family Primary School)

Peak Hill (St Joseph's Primary School)
Trangie (St John's Primary School)
Trundle (St Patrick's Primary School)
Warren	(St Mary's Primary School)
Wilcannia (St Therese's Community School)

See also

Roman Catholicism in Australia

References

External links

Catholic Diocese of Wilcannia–Forbes
Schools Office - Catholic Diocese of Wilcannia–Forbes

 
Wilcannia-Forbes, Roman Catholic Diocese of
Wilcannia
Wilcannia
Wilcannia
Wilcannia